The Swedish Prosecution Authority is the principal agency in Sweden responsible for public prosecutions. It is a wholly independent organisation; not dependent on the courts or the police, and although it is organized under the Ministry of Justice it operates independently and any ministerial interference in cases is unconstitutional. It is headed by the Prosecutor-General of Sweden.

History
The Swedish prosecution service underwent a major reform in 1965. Prior to this, the police and prosecution were organized under the same roof. Following the reform, the Swedish police, the courts and the prosecution service became clearly defined, separate entities. In 1996, there was another major overhaul of the organization, merging smaller local authorities into six regional public prosecutors, all under an attorney general. In 2005, these six regional authorities merged into a single agency, creating the Swedish Prosecution Authority.

Notable cases
In 2019, the Swedish Prosecution Authority reopened an investigation into rape allegations against WikiLeaks founder Julian Assange, first made in 2010, and filed a request for his arrest.

See also

Crime in Sweden

References

External links
 

Law enforcement agencies of Sweden